The CHA Best Scholarly Book in Canadian History Prize is an annual book prize awarded by the Canadian Historical Association. According to the CHA, the award is for the "non-fiction work of Canadian history judged to have made the most significant contribution to an understanding of the Canadian past." Recipients may be either English or French language works. First awarded in 1977, the prize was originally named for Canada's first Prime Minister, Sir John A. Macdonald. However, in 2017, the CHA council proposed changing the name of the award given Macdonald's contentious legacy, particularly in relation to Indigenous peoples. In May 2018, a significant majority of CHA members voted in favour of the change at the Association's annual meeting.

This prize is also part of the Governor General's Awards for excellence in scholarly research. It comes with a prize of $5,000 and is presented by Canada's Governor General at Rideau Hall.

Recipients

See also 

 List of history awards

References

External links 

 Canadian Historical Association Prizes

History awards
Canadian non-fiction literary awards